Robert William Lindberg is an American retired ice hockey left wing and coach who was a two-time All-American for Colorado College and played in three separate World Championships.

Career
Lindberg graduated from Roosevelt High School in 1963 and began attending Colorado College that fall. He was a member of Bob Johnson's first recruiting class and began playing with the varsity club the following year. Unfortunately, the Tigers didn't have any success under Johnson and the team finished last in the WCHA. The poor performance continued for the remainder of Lindberg's tenure with the team, despite switching head coaches before his senior season, but Lindberg was able to stand out from the rest of his teammates. He led the team in scoring as a junior with 41 points and was named an All-American despite not appearing on either All-WCHA Team. He repeated his performance in 1967, adding All-conference honors as well.

After graduating, Lindberg played senior hockey for a couple of seasons and was selected for the US national team at the 1970 Ice Hockey World Championships. Team USA had been relegated the year before and needed to win its bracket have a chance at a gold medal. Lindberg scored 6 points in 7 games as the US swept through their schedule, finishing undefeated and were promoted. Lindberg finished out the season playing for the Fort Wayne Komets but found himself chosen for the national team again the following year. Against much stiffer competition, Lindberg could only record a single assist and the US was relegated to pool B again.

Lindberg remained in Switzerland and continued his playing career after the tournament. He played for four different Swiss clubs over the succeeding 12 years, beginning as a player-coach in the second league. Once he made his way to the National League he found great success with EHC Biel, winning the Swiss league championship in 1978 and 1981. While he was serving as a player-coach in the Swiss B-league, Lindberg was invited to his third World Championships as the US attempted to get promoted back to the top bracket once more. Linberg provided depths scoring for Team USA, but the squad could only finish in second place and had to watch East Germany be advanced to the top bracket.

Career statistics

Regular season and playoffs

International

Awards and honors

References

External links

1945 births
Living people
American ice hockey left wingers
Ice hockey people from Minneapolis
Colorado College Tigers men's ice hockey players
Johnstown Jets players
Fort Wayne Komets players
Lausanne HC players
EHC Biel players
ZSC Lions players
AHCA Division I men's ice hockey All-Americans
Roosevelt High School (Minnesota) alumni
Sports coaches from Minneapolis